Jamasat Udayat (also known as al-Shari'ah) is a large village in northern Syria located in the Qalaat al-Madiq Subdistrict of the al-Suqaylabiyah District in Hama Governorate. According to the Syria Central Bureau of Statistics (CBS), Jamasat Udayat had a population of 8,337 in the 2004 census. Its inhabitants are predominantly Sunni Muslims.

References 

Populated places in al-Suqaylabiyah District
Populated places in al-Ghab Plain